Odontodiaptomus is a genus of freshwater copepods in the family Diaptomidae. It includes the following species:
Odontodiaptomus michaelseni (Mrázek, 1901)
Odontodiaptomus paulistanus (S. Wright, 1936)
Odontodiaptomus thomseni (Brehm, 1933)

References

Diaptomidae
Taxonomy articles created by Polbot